The Landbou-Burger is a local newspaper for farmers from around Cape Town, Western Cape, South Africa. It is in Afrikaans.

Afrikaner culture in Cape Town
Newspapers published in South Africa
Mass media in Cape Town
Afrikaans-language newspapers
Publications with year of establishment missing